Souris was a federal electoral district in the province of Manitoba, Canada, that was represented in the House of Commons of Canada from 1904 to 1953.

This riding was created in 1903 from parts of Brandon and Lisgar ridings.

In 1952, the constituency was merged with the constituency of Brandon to form the district of Brandon—Souris.

Members of Parliament

This riding has elected the following Members of Parliament:

 1904-1917: Frederick Laurence Schaffner - Conservative Party of Canada
 1917-1921: Albert Ernest Finley - Unionist Party
 1921-1930: James Steedsman - Progressive Party of Canada
 1930-1935: Errick French Willis - Progressive Conservative
 1935-1940: George William McDonald - Progressive Conservative
 1940-1952: James Arthur Ross - National Government (1940–1945), Progressive Conservative (1945–1952)

Election results

See also 

 Brandon—Souris
 List of Canadian federal electoral districts
 Past Canadian electoral districts

External links 

Former federal electoral districts of Manitoba